Gerhard Zadrobilek (born 23 June 1961, in Breitenfurt bei Wien) is an Austrian former professional road bicycling racer.

Major results

1981
1st, Overall, Tour of Austria
1984
1st, Chur-Arosa
1987
1st, Giro del Veneto
14th, Tour de France
1989
1st, Clásica de San Sebastián

External links
 

1961 births
Living people
Austrian male cyclists
People from Mödling
Sportspeople from Lower Austria
20th-century Austrian people